Santa Maria, officially the Municipality of Santa Maria, is a 2nd class municipality in the province of Davao Occidental, Philippines. According to the 2020 census, it has a population of 57,526 people. Postal code 8011.

Geography
The noted features of Santa Maria is the Mt. Monkeyawa, standing about more than a hundred-meter above sea level. And at the foot of this mountain, the Municipal Hall where it is located.

Climate

Barangays
Santa Maria is politically subdivided into 22 barangays.

Demographics

Language and dialects 
Tagakaulo - a native dialect originates from the mixture of Bagobo, Mandaya, Davawenyo, and the Lumad peoples of Davao City.
Cebuano

Economy

Government
Municipal officials 2022-2025:
 Mayor: Claude Benjamin II "Dinko" D. Bautista
 Vice Mayor: Josephine B. Mariscal.
 Councilors:
 Jestoni Tiwo
 Rudy B. Mariscal, Jr.
 Lino Solo
 Amel Vistal
 Lea Abe
 Jubane Monsad
 Ondo Mangayao

References

External links

   Santa Maria Profile at the DTI Cities and Municipalities Competitive Index
 [ Philippine Standard Geographic Code]
Philippine Census Information
 Local Governance Performance Management System

Municipalities of Davao Occidental